Loïc De Kergret (born 20 August 1970 in Paris) is a French volleyball player, who won the bronze medal with the Men's National Team at the 2002 World Championships in Argentina.

With Tours VB he won the silver medal at the Men's CEV Champions League 2006–07 and was awarded Final Four' "Best Setter".

International Competitions
1997 – European Championship (4th place)
1999 – World League (7th place)
1999 – European Championship (6th place)
2000 – World League (7th place)
2002 – World League (7th place)
2002 – World Championship (bronze medal)
2003 – European Championship (silver medal)
2003 – FIVB World Cup (5th place)
2004 – World League (5th place)
2004 – Summer Olympics (9th place)

Clubs
  Tours VB (2006-2007)

Awards

Individuals
 2006–07 CEV Champions League "Best Setter"

References

External links
 Team Profile

1970 births
Living people
Volleyball players from Paris
Volleyball players at the 2004 Summer Olympics
Olympic volleyball players of France
Ural Ufa volleyball players
French men's volleyball players